Osgodby is a village in the Selby District of North Yorkshire, England,  from Selby.

Its sister village is Barlby, which lies directly to the west and with which it forms the civil parish of Barlby with Osgodby. The village park has climbing frames, swings, a slide and a football pitch. There is a newly opened pizza takeaway, a builder's merchant, and hairdressing salon. It also has a large garden centre and a country pub called 'The Wadkin Arms'.

There is a pond opposite the village park. It has a bench and a balcony. There is currently a family of moorhens that inhabit the village pond.

Osgodby used to have a village shop, near the Barlby junction, but this is currently closed.

History 
The toponym is from an Old Norse personal name Asgaut, with the Old Danish suffix -by ("farm" or "village"), thus "Asgaut's farm". The place is mentioned in the Domesday Book.

In the Middle Ages the village was in the Ouse and Derwent wapentake of the East Riding of Yorkshire, and in the large ancient parish of Hemingbrough.  It became a separate civil parish in 1866.  In 1935 the civil parish was abolished and merged with the parish of Barlby to form the new parish of Barlby with Osgodby.

In 1974 Osgodby was transferred from the East Riding to the new county of North Yorkshire.

References

External links

Villages in North Yorkshire
Former civil parishes in North Yorkshire
Selby District